O'Chi Brown is an English singer and songwriter born in Tottenham, London, England. She scored two hits on the Dance Club Songs, the most successful being "Whenever You Need Somebody," which hit number one in 1986. Despite strong demand, the song's further progress on the US charts was thwarted when stocks of the record ran out.

The song's producers (Stock Aitken Waterman) would recycle the song for English singer Rick Astley a year later, and it would be the title of his debut studio album on PWL. Brown recorded a duet with Astley, "Leaning To Live (Without Your Love)" for her 1986 album, O'Chi, which was belatedly released as a cash-in single in 1987, but the two singers never met.

Discography

Albums
 Danger Date (1983)
 Love for You (1985)
 O'Chi (1986)
 Light the Night (1987)

Singles

See also
List of Number 1 Dance Hits (United States)
List of artists who reached number one on the US Dance chart

References

External links
 Album and singles discography at Discogs.

20th-century Black British women singers
Brown, O'chi
Brown, O'chi
People from Tottenham
Living people
Year of birth missing (living people)